James Curtis Atkins (March 10, 1921 – February 28, 2009) was an American pitcher in Major League Baseball who played for the Boston Red Sox in the  and  seasons. He was born in Birmingham, Alabama.

Atkins' pro career began in 1941 and was interrupted from 1942 to 1945 by his service as a United States Marine in the Pacific Theater of Operations during World War II.

In a two-season MLB career, Atkins posted a 0–1 record with a 3.60 ERA, two strikeouts, 15 hits allowed and 11 bases on balls in 15 innings of work in four appearances (one as a starter).  In his lone start, on April 21, 1952, at Fenway Park against the Washington Senators, Atkins allowed three hits and two earned runs in  innings. He also went two for three as a batter. But he surrendered five bases on balls and was the losing pitcher in a 3–2 Washington victory.

Atkins won 145 games in the minor leagues, including one 19-win season (1951), and retired from baseball after the 1957 season. He died in Hanceville, Alabama, at the age of 87.

References

External links

Retrosheet

1921 births
2009 deaths
United States Marine Corps personnel of World War II
Baltimore Orioles (IL) players
Baseball players from Birmingham, Alabama
Beaumont Exporters players
Birmingham Barons players
Boston Red Sox players
Geneva Red Birds players
Louisville Colonels (minor league) players
Major League Baseball pitchers
Nashville Vols players
New Orleans Pelicans (baseball) players
Oakland Oaks (baseball) players
San Antonio Missions players
Texarkana Twins players